Tosahwi (c. 1805/10 – c.1878/80), meaning White Knife, was a Penateka Comanche chief. He was deemed "cooperative" by William Babcock Hazen.

Young man: warrior and war chief
In January 1846, along with Amorous Man, Old Owl,  Buffalo Hump, Yellow Wolf, Santa Anna, Ketumse, and Asa-havey ("Milky Way"), he signed the Treaty of Tehuacana Creek. After 1849, with the death of Old Owl and Santa Anna, the departure of Pah-hayoco (now settled, during his last years, as resident guest among the Kotsoteka band), and Buffalo Hump's becoming first chief and Yellow Wolf's becoming second chief of the Penateka Comanches until his own death in 1854, Tosahwi became one among the most important chiefs of the Penateka band, second to Ketumse in the reservation.

Councils and treaties
In 1861, along with the Yamparika head chief Ten Bears, the Nokoni chief Horseback and his Penateka comrade Asa-havey, Tosahwi went to Fort Cobb where they met General Albert Pike (C.S.A.), and the Comanche chiefs (including the Nokoni head chief Quenah-evah, called "Eagle Drink" by the white people, and the Kotsoteka chief Mow-way) signed for an allegiance with the Confederation. As a leader of the Penateka band, Tosahwi engaged in many raids in the American Southwest in the 1860s, but in 1867–1868 he was the first Comanche leader to surrender to the military at Fort Cobb in the Indian Territory, and, on this occasion, he is reported to have had an alleged exchange with Philip Sheridan where Sheridan purportedly stated "The only good Indians I ever saw were dead", which was sometimes rephrased as "the only good Indian is a dead Indian." Sheridan denied ever making either statement. He signed as head chief of the Penateka the Medicine Lodge Treaty, and accepted to sit in a reservation, under the control of Fort Cobb, having the Comanche Agency in the Eureka Valley. He managed to keep out the Penateka, preventing their involvement in the Red River War in 1873–1874.

Sources
 Wallace, Ernest & Hoebel, E. Adamson. The Comanche: Lords of the Southern Plains, University of Oklahoma Press, Norman, 1952
 Nye, Wilbur Sturtevant. Carbine and Lance: The Story of Old Fort Sill, University of Oklahoma Press, Norman, 1983
 Leckie, William H. The Buffalo Soldiers: A Narrative of the Negro Cavalry in the West, University of Oklahoma Press, Norman, 1967
 Fowler, Arlen L. The Black Infantry in the West, 1869-1891, University of Oklahoma Press, Norman, 1996
 Brown, Dee. Bury My Heart at Wounded Knee: An Indian History of the American West, Holt, Rinehart & Winston, New York, 1970

References 

Comanche people
Native American leaders
Native American people of the Indian Wars
Texas–Indian Wars
Native American history of Texas
1800s births
1870s deaths